Jordan Media City is a media city based in Jordan.

History and profile
Jordan Media City was established in 2001. It is a private company founded as a result of an agreement between the government of the Hashemite kingdom of Jordan and Dallah Production Company. It was set up with a capital of ten million JDs (15 million US Dollars). It now transmits over 247 channels and retransmits 57 radio broadcasts. Most channels are not Jordanian based, and the government still possess restrictions on Jordanian based channels which makes it hard to open new Jordanian TV channels.

Jordan Media City is centrally located next to Jordan Radio and Television Station. It is a short distance from Queen Alia International Airport, and just a few minutes away from Jordan's main highway which connects the country's northern borders with its only port in Aqaba in the south.

List of companies 
The list below is incomplete.
 Arab Radio and Television Network (headquarters)
  (headquarters)
 Ro'ya TV (headquarters)

See also 
Dubai Media City
IMPZ
Creative City
Egyptian Media Production City

References

External links 
 Jordan Media City (official website)

Special economic zones
Media City
Media City
Media City
2001 establishments in Jordan
Mass media in Amman